"Never Say Never Again" is a song by the Bee Gees, It was written by Barry, Robin & Maurice Gibb in 1968 and released on the album Odessa in 1969.

Writing and recording

Robin recalled that he wanted to write a song with the line, 'I declared war on Spain. According to Robin: "Instead, Barry wanted something so normal it was ridiculous. He said my words were so unromantic. But what could be more normal than a man in love wanting to declare war on anything that was to him unlovely?".

Unlike the other songs on the album, this song was recorded quickly. The Sketches for Odessa disc, released with the album's 2009 remastered edition, has an alternate mono mix from December 7, 1968 with a distorted electric guitar part that is not on the multitrack master and a different lead vocal take. At the beginning of the song, the chord was A.

Personnel
 Barry Gibb — lead and harmony vocal, guitar
 Robin Gibb - harmony vocal
 Maurice Gibb — bass, guitar, piano, harmony vocal
 Colin Petersen — drums
 Bill Shepherd — orchestral arrangement

Cover versions
Tangerine Peel covered "Never Say Never Again" released it as a single on MGM Records.

References

1969 songs
Bee Gees songs
Songs written by Barry Gibb
Songs written by Robin Gibb
Songs written by Maurice Gibb
Song recordings produced by Robert Stigwood
Song recordings produced by Barry Gibb
Song recordings produced by Robin Gibb
Song recordings produced by Maurice Gibb